Lygdamus was a Roman poet who wrote in Classical Latin. Six of his elegies, addressed to a girl named Neaera, are preserved in the Appendix Tibulliana alongside the apocryphal works of Tibullus. He belonged to the literary circle around Marcus Valerius Messalla Corvinus. In poem 5, he describes himself as young and gives his birth year as 43 BC. This line, however, is nearly identical to one in Ovid's Tristia from AD 11, which indicates that either Lygdamus is lying about his age or else Ovid was imitating him. It has even been suggested "Lygdamus" is merely a pen name used by the young Ovid.

Editions
Navarro Antolín, Fernando, ed. Lygdamus: Corpus Tibullianum III.1–6: Lygdami Elegiarum Liber. Leiden: Brill, 1996.

References

43 BC births

Year of death unknown
Golden Age Latin writers
1st-century BC Roman poets
1st-century Roman poets
Elegiac poets